The Ellipse Titan is a French high-wing, single-place, hang glider designed and produced by La société Ellipse of Étuz, introduced in 2002.

Design and development
The Titan was designed as a competition hang glider and is built in two different models and two sizes.

Typical of the series, the Titan Comp 12.5 is made from aluminum tubing, with the wing covered in Dacron sailcloth. Its  span wing is a "topless" design, lacking a kingpost and upper flying wires. The nose angle is 132° and the aspect ratio is 7.2:1. The model number indicates the approximate wing area in square metres.

Variants
Titan Comp 12.5
Titan Comp 13.5
Titan Easy 12.5
Titan Comp 13.5

Specifications (Titan Easy 13.5)

References

External links

Hang gliders